Leonardo Spinazzola  (born 25 March 1993) is an Italian professional footballer who plays as a left-sided midfielder or wing-back for Serie A club Roma and the Italy national team.

Club career

Early years with Siena and loan spells across Italy from Juventus
Born in Foligno, Spinazzola started his career at Siena's youth setup. In 2010, he joined Juventus in a temporary deal, being assigned to the Primavera squad. In June 2012 Juventus signed half of the registration rights for €400,000.

On 5 July 2012 Spinazzola and Filippo Boniperti were loaned to Serie B side Empoli in a season-long loan. On 1 September he played his first match as a professional, coming on as a second-half substitute in a 2–2 away draw against Novara.

Spinazzola scored his first professional goal on the 15th, but in a 2–4 loss at Livorno. After appearing in only seven matches, his loan spell was cut short and he moved to Virtus Lanciano also in a temporary deal in January 2013.

Spinazzola only appeared in three matches with Virtus, all from the bench. On 10 August 2013 he was again loaned, this time to his first club Siena; he appeared regularly with the latter, contributing with 24 matches and one goal for the latter, which narrowly missed out play-offs.

In June 2014 the co-ownership agreement between Siena and Juventus was renewed again. However, after the bankruptcy of Siena in July, Juventus acquired the remaining 50% registration rights of Spinazzola from Siena for free.

On 11 August 2014, Spinazzola joined Serie A side Atalanta also in a loan deal. On 23 August, he made his debut for the club, scoring the last goal of a 2–0 home win against Pisa in the Coppa Italia. Spinazzola made his debut in the Italian top flight on 31 August, replacing Marcelo Estigarribia in the 82nd minute of a 0–0 home draw against Verona. After spells on loan with Vicenza and Perugia, Spinazzola returned to Atalanta in July 2016.

Juventus 
After spending two seasons on loan with Atalanta, Spinazzola returned to Juventus in mid 2018. An ACL injury ruled him out for the first half of the 2018–19 season. On 11 November, Spinazzola played a match for Juventus U19 in which he scored a goal after 35 minutes in a 3–1 away win against Sassuolo U19. Spinazzola made his Juventus debut on 12 January 2019, in a 2–0 away win over Bologna in the Coppa Italia. Prior to his debut for Juventus, Spinazzola had played two matches for Juventus U19.  He made his Champions League debut on 12 March, starting in a 3–0 home win over Atlético Madrid, in the round of 16 of the tournament, which enabled Juventus to advance to the quarter-finals 3–2 on aggregate.

Roma
On 1 July 2019, Spinazzola joined Roma from Juventus for €29.5 million, signing a four-year contract with the club, while Luca Pellegrini moved in the opposite direction. In January 2020, Spinazzola was close to a transfer move to Inter Milan in exchange for Matteo Politano, but the deal collapsed at the last minute as Inter was not entirely satisfied with Spinazzola's physical conditions.

International career
On 28 March 2017, Spinazzola made his senior international debut for the Italy national team, along with four other players, coming on as a substitute in a 2–1 friendly away win against the Netherlands.

In June 2021, Spinazzola was included in Italy's squad for UEFA Euro 2020 by manager Roberto Mancini. In the opening match of the tournament on 11 June, a 3–0 win over Turkey, Spinazzola was named man of the match by UEFA for his performance, during which he was credited with an assist on his team's second goal, after his parried shot was scored by Ciro Immobile off the rebound. On 26 June, he assisted the opening goal scored by Federico Chiesa in extra-time on an eventual 2–1 win over Austria in the round of 16, and was also later also involved in the match-winning goal scored by Matteo Pessina; due to his performance, he was named man of the match for the second time in the tournament by UEFA. On 2 July, late in the 2–1 quarter-final win over Belgium, Spinazzola was stretchered off the pitch with an Achilles tendon rupture, ending his time in the tournament. On 5 July, Spinazzola underwent a successful surgery of his left Achilles tendon. On 11 July, Spinazzola won the European Championship with Italy following a 3–2 penalty shoot-out victory over England in the final at Wembley Stadium after a 1–1 draw in extra-time. Spinazzola was clocked as the fastest player of the tournament, tied with Hungary's Loïc Négo, reaching a top speed of 33.8 km/h. For his performances, he was included in the team of the tournament.

Style of play
Although naturally right-footed, Spinazzola prefers playing on the left flank, either as a full-back, wing-back, or winger; a versatile player, he is also capable of playing on the right side of the pitch. A quick, athletic, and offensive-minded player, he is known for his stamina, world class speed and acceleration, physicality, and his polished dribbling skills, which enable him to beat his man in one on one situations on the wing with feints or changes of pace. He is also capable of playing the ball first time, cutting into the centre and providing in-swinging crosses to teammates, or providing depth to his team with his attacking runs down the flank. Defensively, he is known for his anticipation and ability in the air. His versatility, characteristics, role, and playing style have drawn comparisons with former Italy and Juventus wing-back Gianluca Zambrotta, whom Spinazzola himself has cited as one of his major influences.

Personal life 
In May 2018, Spinazzola and then girlfriend Miriam Sette had a son together. On 24 December 2020, the couple married. In February 2021, the couple had a second child together, a daughter.

Career statistics

Club

International

Honours
Juventus Youth
 Torneo di Viareggio: 2012 
Juventus
 Serie A: 2018–19
 Supercoppa Italiana: 2018

Roma
 UEFA Europa Conference League: 2021–22

Italy
 UEFA European Championship: 2020

Individual
 UEFA European Championship Team of the Tournament: 2020
 UEFA Europa League Squad of the Season: 2020–21
 Torneo di Viareggio Best Player: 2012

Orders
 5th Class / Knight: Cavaliere Ordine al Merito della Repubblica Italiana: 2021

References

External links

Profile at the A.S. Roma website

FIGC profile 

สปินาโซล่า At uoindex

1993 births
Living people
People from Foligno
Footballers from Umbria
Italian footballers
Italy youth international footballers
Italy international footballers
Association football midfielders
A.C.N. Siena 1904 players
Juventus F.C. players
Empoli F.C. players
S.S. Virtus Lanciano 1924 players
Atalanta B.C. players
L.R. Vicenza players
A.C. Perugia Calcio players
A.S. Roma players
Serie B players
Serie A players
UEFA Euro 2020 players
UEFA European Championship-winning players
Knights of the Order of Merit of the Italian Republic
Sportspeople from the Province of Perugia
UEFA Europa Conference League winning players